John Joseph "Jack" Wilson (May 28, 1926 – May 4, 2015) was an American Democratic Party politician who served in the New Jersey General Assembly from 1958 to 1964.

He was a graduate of Saint Benedict's Preparatory School in Newark, Seton Hall University, and Seton Hall Law School.  He served in the United States Navy during World War II, and as a military police lieutenant in the Army during the Korean War.

A resident of Westfield, New Jersey. he was elected to the New Jersey State Assembly in 1957, and was re-elected in 1959 and 1961.  In 1963, he sought the Democratic nomination for the New Jersey State Senate, but lost the primary to his Assembly colleague, James M. McGowan.

References

1926 births
2015 deaths
Democratic Party members of the New Jersey General Assembly
United States Navy personnel of World War II
United States Army personnel of the Korean War
People from Westfield, New Jersey
Politicians from Union County, New Jersey
St. Benedict's Preparatory School alumni
Seton Hall University School of Law alumni
United States Army officers
American military police officers
Military personnel from New Jersey
20th-century American politicians